Hidasnémeti is a village in Borsod-Abaúj-Zemplén County in northeastern Hungary.

Sport
The association football club, Hidasnémeti VSC, is based in the town.

References

Populated places in Borsod-Abaúj-Zemplén County